Paige Louise Williams (10 March 1995) is an English football defender who played for Birmingham City Ladies in FA WSL in England. She previously played for both AGSM Verona, ACF Brescia in Italy and Everton L.F.C. in England.

Williams has represented England on the under-15, under-17, under-19, under-20, and under-23 national teams.

Honours

Serie A champions 2015/2016 Brescia

Coppa Italia 2015/2016 Brescia

F A Cup Runner Up 2013/2014 Everton Ladies FC

UEFA U19 Championship Women - Runners Up 2013 (England)

Fa cup runners up 2016-2017 Birmingham City Ladies

References

External links

 
 
 FA player profile
 Everton player profile

1995 births
Living people
English women's footballers
Expatriate women's footballers in Italy
Women's Super League players
Serie A (women's football) players
Everton F.C. (women) players
A.C.F. Brescia Calcio Femminile players
A.S.D. AGSM Verona F.C. players
Birmingham City W.F.C. players
Women's association football defenders
English expatriate women's footballers
English expatriate sportspeople in Italy
Footballers from Liverpool